Gościęcino is a non-operational PKP railway station on the disused PKP rail line 230 in Gościęcino (Pomeranian Voivodeship), Poland.

Lines crossing the station

References 
 Gościęcino article at Polish Stations Database, URL accessed at 19 March 2006

Disused railway stations in Pomeranian Voivodeship
Railway stations in Pomeranian Voivodeship
Wejherowo County